Walter Cayetano Cuder (born 25 December 1982) is an Argentine footballer who played professionally in both Argentina and Uruguay.

References

1982 births
Living people
Sportspeople from Entre Ríos Province
Argentine footballers
Association football midfielders
Unión de Santa Fe footballers
Liverpool F.C. (Montevideo) players
Paysandú F.C. players
Central Norte players
Crucero del Norte footballers
Libertad de Sunchales footballers
Unión de Sunchales footballers
Expatriate footballers in Uruguay
Argentine expatriate footballers